This was the first edition of the tournament.

Lloyd Glasspool and Harri Heliövaara won the title after defeating Andrea Vavassori and David Vega Hernández 6–3, 6–0 in  the final.

Seeds

Draw

References

External links
 Main draw

Open Città di Bari - Doubles